NYLUG (New York Linux Users Group) is a LUG (Linux User Group) based out of New York City. NYLUG supports all things Linux and FLOSS in the greater New York City area.

NYLUG meets on a monthly basis, and features a speaker or speakers who give presentations of interest to the NYLUG membership. These presentations are generally either technical or related to FLOSS. NYLUG's first presentation was in January, 1999 and NYLUG has been in continuous operation since then. As such, NYLUG is the oldest LUG in New York City.

NYLUG also runs a number of popular mailing lists and an IRC channel.

In addition to monthly presentations, NYLUG holds monthly workshops and occasional social events for its membership.

A significant number of members of NYLUG were involved in planning for the first DebConf in the United States - which was held in New York City in August 2010.

Notable speakers 
 Chris DiBona
 Theodore Ts'o
 Jon "maddog" Hall
 Jeremy Allison
 Dr. Eben Moglen
 Miguel de Icaza
 Eric S. Raymond
 Dan Ravicher
 Klaus Knopper
 Dave Aitel
 Benjamin Mako Hill
 Elliotte Rusty Harold
 Craig Nevill-Manning
 Moshe Bar
 Ian Pratt
 Alex Martelli
 Donald Becker
 Arthur Tyde
 Chris Blizzard
 Havoc Pennington
 Jason Perlow
 Dr. Srinidhi Varadarajan
 Zed Shaw
 Russ Nelson
 David S. Miller
 Wietse Venema
 Gabriella Coleman
 Tom Limoncelli
 Thomas Bushnell
 Stefano Zacchiroli
 James Turnbull
 Lennart Poettering
 Karen Sandler
 Frank Karlitschek
 Chris Lamb (software_developer)
 David Reveman
 Michael Kerrisk

References

External links 
 NYLUG Homepage
 NYLUG Hacking Society/Coding Workshop
 NYLUG Meetup page

Information technology organizations based in North America
Linux user groups
Organizations based in New York City